Andy Lyons is the name of:

Andy Lyons (English footballer) (born 1966), English football coach and former midfielder
Andy Lyons (Irish footballer) (born 2000), Irish football defender for Blackpool